"Handlebars" is a song by Flobots. It was released as the first single from their debut album, Fight with Tools, and is the group's largest success, peaking at number 37 on the Billboard Hot 100 and number three on the Billboard Modern Rock Tracks chart.

Background
"Handlebars" was originally released in 2005 on the band's first EP, Flobots Present...Platypus, before being re-released on Fight with Tools two years later with a re-recorded vocal. The song won in a fan-voted local radio station contest at the end of 2007, giving the song the chance to be played on the station.  The song was so popular that it was put into full rotation at the station by the end of January, attracting the attention of record companies. The Flobots ultimately signed with Universal Republic off the back of the single's success.

In May 2019, Flobots sued YouTube user Logan Paul for copyright infringement over his 2017 single "No Handlebars". The group has requested all royalties for the song, which has earned Paul over $1 million since 2017.

Theme
Jamie Laurie stated that the song is about "the idea that we have so much incredible potential as human beings to be destructive or to be creative." "And it's tragic to me that the appetite for military innovation is endless, but when it comes to taking on a project like ending world hunger, it's seen as outlandish. It's not treated with the same seriousness. ... at the same time, I knew there were people at that moment who were being bombed by our own country. And I thought that was incredibly powerful." It is the contrast between these "little moments of creativity, these bursts of innovation," and the way these ideas are put to use "to oppress and destroy people" that the singer feels is "beautiful and tragic at the same time."

Music video
The animated video for the song starts out lighthearted, showing two young friends, one wearing casual clothes and the other in a businesslike suit, sitting on a hill looking over a city. Prominent in the city is a crystalline tower with part of its framework showing. The friends ride their bikes down the hill without their hands on the handlebars, while the casual friend smiles widely. They arrive at a sign that points in two directions, one labeled with a corporate-looking symbol leading to a shadowed street, and the other labeled by a dove leading down a sunlit street. They hug and head their separate ways, the casual friend taking the path of the dove.

The next part of the song centers on the casual friend. He walks along a cracked sidewalk and sees a chalk drawing depicting the first scene of the video: two friends on bicycles with their arms in the air, riding down a hill next to a city. He picks up an apple off of the ground and returns it to its barrel. He walks past a street corner that shows a path to the corporate street, unaware of the blood on that street's walls. He picks up his phone and sees the corporate friend's face. Here the perspective switches to the other friend, and he speaks to the peaceful friend on the phone.

The corporate friend hangs up and walks down the street. He lists his accomplishments, as shown in the video, before stopping in front of and looking up at the same tower that appeared in the beginning of the video. In the next scene he is completing a transaction with a man in a board room. A graph displays profits zigzagging up a board with the corporate logo on it before ending in what resembles a spatter of blood. The camera zooms out, revealing that he was inside the tower. He then gives a televised speech behind a podium, while the background changes from a corporate to a political setting with two American flags. The other friend sees it, disappointedly shaking his head.

The world becomes more bleak and oppressive, with security cameras and smokestacks, emblazoned with the corporate logo, spewing toxic fumes into the air. A hawk kills a dove, and a fighter jet soars overhead.

In the next sequence, the previously peaceful friend begins rallying a crowd of oppressed-looking people. A man wearing a bandana sprays an X over a poster with a picture of the now-dictator-like friend on it, and then the word "LIAR" below that. The rebellious friend leads the crowd of people towards the tower, but a line of heavily armed riot-control officers, with shields displaying a fist and submachine guns, proceeds to kill the entire crowd. The bandana-wearing man is killed first by a sniper, following many more deaths. The corporate friend looks on horrified as he sees his friend shot down dead and lying on the ground.

The video ends with a flashback of the two friends pedaling off riding with no handlebars crisscrossing into a bright light.

Several times in the video, the dove is used to symbolise peace, while the hawk represents oppressive power destroying that peace. A hawk kills an actual dove, and a wrecking ball destroys a wall with a dove painted on it, located next to a billboard displaying the corporate symbol and a cityscape again featuring the tower. In addition, a hawk flies over the head of the corporate friend when he is walking down the street.

Che Guevara, an iconic revolutionary, is referenced in the video when an image of Guevara's face appears on a man's T-shirt while the oppressed friend is rallying a crowd. Another reference is to the Abu Ghraib tortures during the Iraq War, seen in a flashing image identical to the iconic photograph of prisoner Abdou Hussain Saad Faleh.

Chart performance
On May 17, 2008, the song peaked at number 3 on the Billboard Modern Rock Tracks. Fueled by radio airplay, including six straight weeks at the top of KROQ's most played list, it was the first single since Semisonic's "Closing Time" to chart in the top ten so quickly.

It has had similar success on the digital landscape, having over 16,500,000 total plays on the band's MySpace.com page and over a substantial 54 million views on YouTube. Digital download purchases have placed the song at number 4 on certain rap and hip-hop charts on Amazon.com.

"Handlebars" also performed well on the Billboard charts. Peaking at number three on the Modern Rock Tracks chart, number twenty-two on the Hot Digital Songs chart, number thirty-five on the Pop 100 chart, number thirty-seven on the Hot 100 chart, number sixty-three on the Canadian Hot 100.

On September 7, 2008, the song entered the UK Singles Chart at number 35 on downloads alone and peaked at 14.

Track listing
Compact Disc
"Handlebars" – 3:27
"Rise" – 4:10

7-inch vinyl
"Handlebars" – 3:27
"Handlebars" (DJ Shadow Remix) – 4:03

Personnel
Flobots
Jamie "Jonny 5" Laurie –  vocals
Brer Rabbit – vocals
Jesse Walker – electric bass
Andy "Rok" Guerrero – guitar
Mackenzie Roberts – viola
Kenny Ortiz – drums
Guest musicians
Joe Ferrone – trumpet

Charts

Weekly charts

Year-end charts

Certifications

References

2008 debut singles
Flobots songs
Songs about bicycles
2008 songs
Universal Republic Records singles
Political rap songs
Anti-fascist music
Animated music videos